RwandAir Limited is the flag carrier airline of Rwanda. It operates domestic and international services to East Africa, Central Africa, West Africa, Southern Africa, Europe, the Middle East and Asia, from its main base at Kigali International Airport in Kigali.

History

Incorporation 

After the 1994 genocide, the government took several attempts to revive the former national carrier Air Rwanda that ceased operations during the genocide. Various private companies showed interest in partnering with the government, and Uganda-based SA Alliance Air ran the company from 1997 to 2000. After SA Alliance ceased operations, the government of Rwanda took over the Rwandan operations and re-branded the airline, to ensure its continuity. RwandAir began operations on 1 December 2002 as the new national carrier for Rwanda under the name Rwandair Express (with passenger air transportation as the core activity). In 2016, RwandAir received International Air Transport Association's Safety Audit for Ground Operations (ISAGO).

Re-branding 
The airline began to expand regionally and by 2009 the network included Dar-es-Salaam, Nairobi, and domestic destinations such as Gisenyi. In March 2009, the airline registered the new trademark RwandAir Limited, which is its current operating name. In June 2009, the airline officially re-branded from Rwandair Express to RwandAir, because the new name implied a large, serious airline, while the "Express" in the former name implied a small regional operation.

In May 2010, Rene Janata became the CEO, introducing a frequent flyer program and developing the airline to become a network carrier. In October 2010, John Mirenge became the new CEO of RwandAir.

2010–2015 
In July 2010, the first of RwandAir's new Boeing 737-500s arrived; the second one arrived on 20 October 2010. Both are leased from General Electric Capital Aviation Services (GECAS) and each has a two-class configuration with 12 business class seats and 90 economy class seats.

In August 2011, the airline took delivery of their first aircraft purchased directly from an airline manufacturer. All prior aircraft operated by RwandAir had been either leased or bought as a second-hand aircraft. The aircraft that was purchased is a Boeing 737-800 with Sky Interior, also known as the Boeing 737 Next Generation, and was the only one operating among African airlines. The flight departed from Boeing Field in Seattle, Washington, United States, at 5:30 PM PST. It made its first stop in Keflavík International Airport in Iceland, then it headed for a second stop to Istanbul, Turkey. It finally arrived in Kigali, Rwanda, after a 20-hour flight.

In October 2011, RwandAir took delivery of their second Boeing Next Generation 737-800. During January 2012, the airline disposed of the two CRJ200 aircraft it owned, in anticipation of acquiring two CRJ-900NGs.

In February 2013, John Mirenge announced that the airline would fly to Accra, Cape Town, Harare, Juba, and Zanzibar.

In May 2015, RwandAir officially became an IATA member.

2015 - present
In 2017, the Government of Benin granted RwandAir seventh freedom rights to operate direct flights from Benin. RwandAir plans to base two Boeing 737 aircraft at Cotonou International Airport in Benin.

In February 2020, two months after Qatar Airways purchased a 60% stake in Rwanda's Bugesera International Airport, the Qatari state-owned airline purchased a 49% stake in RwandAir.

Flight Pass

In 2019, RwandAir entered into a partnership with USA-based Optiontown to launch a prepaid flight subscription platform called Flight Pass, which enables customers to pre-purchase RwandAir flights at the best available price and decide when they want to travel at a later date.

In September 2022, the airline's intentions in joining Oneworld, with a sponsorship from Qatar Airways, were announced. This would make RwandAir the third airline to enter an airline alliance in East Africa, after Ethiopian Airlines (Star Alliance) and Kenya Airways (SkyTeam), and second African airline after Royal Air Maroc to join Oneworld.

Corporate affairs

Ownership and management
Rwandair is owned 100 percent by the Government of Rwanda. As of May 2021, an agreement to sell a 49 percent stake to Qatar Airways is said to be in the final stages.

The government hoped to privatise the airline after 2013, once it became profitable; the process had been abandoned in 2008 after it emerged that nobody at the time was willing to offer the amount expected from the sale.

RwandAir's board of directors is responsible for ensuring that the airline follows a suitable corporate governance framework to ensure the creation and protection of value for the shareholder. Patricie Uwase is currently the Chairman of RwandAir since September 2021; the long-time aviation veteran Girma Wake was chairman from 2012 to 2017. Yvonne Manzi Makolo is the current CEO, having been promoted from deputy CEO, in charge of Corporate Affairs, in April 2018. She replaced acting CEO Col. Chance Ndagano.

Business trends 
RwandAir has been loss-making for many years.

Full detailed accounts are rarely published, although intermittently some figures are made public by senior management or the government, or in government budgetary reports. Available trends are shown below (as at year ending 31 December):

Head office
The airline has its head office on the top floor of the main building of Kigali International Airport in Kigali, Rwanda. The airline previously had its head office in Centenary House in Kigali. The airline began moving its operations from Centenary House to the airport on Friday 14 May 2010. The airline was scheduled to be moved in by Monday 17 May 2010. At one previous point the airline had its head office in the Telcom House.

Destinations
RwandAir serves the following destinations as of December 2020:

Codeshare agreements

RwandAir codeshares with the following airlines:

 Brussels Airlines
 Ethiopian Airlines
 Qatar Airways 
 South African Airways
 Turkish Airlines
 Westair Aviation

Fleet

The RwandAir fleet comprises the following aircraft as of March 2023:

References

External links

 Official website

Airlines of Rwanda
Airlines established in 2003
Government-owned airlines
2003 establishments in Rwanda
Organisations based in Kigali
Economy of Kigali